Dhital is a surname of people belonging to the brahmin and chhetri caste from Nepal. This name might have come from a combination of the words "Dhee" (excellent) and "Tal" (rhythm), meaning "a person with an excellent rhythm". Dhital's origin is most likely from Jumla, a northwestern district of Nepal, but people with her surname are now scattered all over the country, including in Dhading, Lamjung, Gorkha, Dang, Nawalparasi, Kathmandu, Nuwakot, Kavrepalanchok, Sindhupalchowk and Rupandehi.

Notable people with the name
 Kumud Dhital, cardiothoracic specialist and transplant surgeon in Australia
 Shreya Dhital (born 1995), Nepalese swimmer

External links
http://www.ancientfaces.com/surname/dhital-family-history/785730

Surnames of Nepalese origin
Khas surnames